James Ostrander may refer to:
 James W. Ostrander, member of the Wisconsin State Assembly
 James H. Ostrander, member of the Wisconsin State Assembly